This is a list of submarine classes of the Royal Navy of the United Kingdom. Dates of construction given.

Petrol-electric

Diesel-electric 
 D class — 8 boats, 1908–1912
 E class — 58 boats, 1912–1916
 F class — 3 boats, 1913–1917
 S class — 3 boats, 1914–1915
 V class — 4 boats, 1914–1915
 W class — 4 boats, 1914–1915
 G class — 14 boats, 1915–1917
 H class — 44 boats, 1915–1919
 J class — 7 boats, 1915–1917
 L class — 34 boats, 1917–1919
 M class — 3 boats, 1917–1918
 Nautilus class — 1 boat, 1917
 R class — 12 boats, 1918
  — 1 boat, 1921
  — 9 boats 1926–29 (subclasses Oberon 1 boat, Oxley 2 boats, Odin 6 boats)
  — 6 boats, 1929
  — 4 boats, 1930
 S class — 62 boats (subclasses Swordfish 4, Shark 8, Seraph 33, Subtle 17), 1931–1945
 Thames class — 3 boats, 1932
  — 6 boats, 1932–1938
 T class — 52 boats (subclasses Triton 15, Tempest 15, Taciturn 22), 1937–1945
 Undine class — 3 boats, 1937–1938
 P611 class — 4 boats, 1940
 Umpire class — 37 boats, 1940–1943
 Vampire class — 22 boats, 1943–1944
  — 16 boats, 1945–1947
  — 2 boats, 1954–1955
  — 4 boats, 1954–1955
 Porpoise class — 8 boats, 1956–1959
  — 13 boats, 1959–1966
  — 4 boats, 1986–1992

Midget 
  — 20 boats, 1943–1944
  — 12 boats, 1944
  — 4 boats, 1954–1955

Rescue submersible 
 LR5 — leased to the Royal Australian Navy in 2009

Steam-electric 
 Swordfish — 1 boat, 1916–1922
 K class — 22 boats, 1916–1919

Foreign-built
 Archimede class — 1 boat, 1934
 Type VIIC U-boat — 1 boat, 1941
 Type XVII U-boat — 1 boat, 1943

Nuclear powered

Land Based Prototype
 HMS Vulcan PWR 1 (Dounreay Submarine Prototype 1) 1965–1984
 HMS Vulcan PWR 2 (Shore Test Facility) 1987–present

Fleet 
  — one boat, 1959–1960
  — 2 boats, 1962–1965
  — 3 boats, 1967–1970
  — 6 boats, 1969–1979
  — 7 boats, 1979–1991
  — 7 boats planned (4 in service), 2001–present

Ballistic missile 
  — 4 boats, 1964–1986
  — 4 boats, 1986–1998
  — 4 boats planned, 2028 onwards

See also
 Royal Navy Submarine Service
 List of submarines of the Royal Navy

References

External links
 MaritimeQuest Holland Class Overview
 MaritimeQuest A Class (1902) Class Overview
 MaritimeQuest B Class Overview
 MaritimeQuest C Class Overview
 MaritimeQuest A Class (1943) Class Overview
MaritimeQuest Trafalgar Class Overview

Submarines
Royal Navy
 
Royal Navy submarines